Oregon Trail is a 1945 American Western film directed by Thomas Carr and written by Betty Burbridge. The film stars Sunset Carson, Peggy Stewart, Frank Jaquet, John Merton, Mary Carr and Si Jenks. The film was released on July 14, 1945, by Republic Pictures.

Plot
After the Harvey Dawson gang robs a Union Pacific train of fifty thousand dollars in gold bullion, railroad detective Sunset Carson goes undercover to infiltrate the gang. To help establish Sunset's cover as the outlaw Jim Parker,  the Union Pacific's chief detective chases him off a train and through the streets of a small western town. Sunset's escape is abetted by the lovely Jill Layton (Peggy Stewart), who was amused by Sunset during the train ride.

Cast  
Sunset Carson as Sunset Carson posing as Jim Parker
Peggy Stewart as Jill Layton
Frank Jaquet as George Layton
John Merton as Dalt Higgins
Mary Carr as Granny Layton
Si Jenks as Andy Kline 
Bud Geary as Henchman Fletch Hobbs
Kenne Duncan as Henchman Johnny Slade
Steve Winston as Dick Pendleton
Lee Shumway as Captain Street 
Earle Hodgins as Judge J. Frothingham Smythe
Tom London as Sheriff Plenner

References

External links 
 

1945 films
American Western (genre) films
1945 Western (genre) films
Republic Pictures films
Films directed by Thomas Carr
American black-and-white films
1940s English-language films
1940s American films